Naorem Priyangka Devi (born 9 April 2003) is an Indian professional footballer who plays as a midfielder for the India women's national football team and Kerala Blasters in the Kerala Women's League.

Club career
Devi started her senior career with Indian Arrows and played for them in the Indian Women's League. On 14 May 2022, she scored 4 goals in a  8-0 victory against Mata Rukmani FC. Priyangka Devi scored nine goals in 11 matches during the season. She was awarded with the emerging player of the season. In 2022, she was signed by Kerala Blasters as a part of their newly launched women's team.

International career
With four goals, Devi was India's top-scorer in the 2021 SAFF U-19 Women's Championship. She was later called up into the senior national team in 2022. She made her debut for the senior national team on 6 April 2022 and scored the only goal in a 1-0 against Egypt.

International goals
Scores and results list India's goal tally first.

Honours

Manipur
 National Games Gold medal: 2022

Individual
 Indian Women's League Emerging Player of the League: 2021–22

References

External links 
 Naorem Priyangka Devi at All India Football Federation
 

Living people
Footballers from Manipur
Sportswomen from Manipur
Indian women's footballers
India women's international footballers
Women's association football forwards
2003 births
Indian Women's League players
Kerala Blasters FC Women players